Janušauskas is a Lithuanian surname, a Lithuanization of the Polish surname Januszewski. Notable people with the surname include:

Stasys Janušauskas, Lithuanian footballer
Severija Janušauskaitė, Lithuanian stage and film actress
Leokadija Počikovska-Janušauskienė,  Lithuanian politician of Polish nationality and a public activist

See also

Lithuanian-language surnames